The Korean War Wall of Honor, or Utah Korean War Memorial, is a war memorial Memory Grove in Salt Lake City, Utah, United States.

References

External links

Monuments and memorials in Utah
Military monuments and memorials in the United States
Outdoor sculptures in Salt Lake City
Korean War memorials and cemeteries